Le Roux Roets (born 14 January 1995) is a South African rugby union player for South African side the  in Super Rugby. His regular position is lock.

References

South African rugby union players
Living people
1995 births
People from Boksburg
Rugby union locks
Blue Bulls players
Golden Lions players
Pumas (Currie Cup) players
Rugby union players from Gauteng
New South Wales Waratahs players
Sharks (rugby union) players
Sharks (Currie Cup) players